Magnolia liliiflora is a small tree native to southwest China (in Sichuan and Yunnan), but cultivated for centuries elsewhere in China and also Japan. Variously known by many names, including Mulan magnolia, purple magnolia, red magnolia, lily magnolia, tulip magnolia and woody-orchid, it was first introduced to English-speaking countries from cultivated Japanese origins, and is thus also sometimes called Japanese magnolia, though it is not native to Japan. It is now also planted as an ornamental in North America and Europe, though rather less often than its popular hybrid (see below).

It is a deciduous shrub, exceptionally a small tree, to 4m tall (smaller than most other magnolias), and blooms profusely in early spring with large pink to purple showy flowers, before the leaf buds open.

The cultivar 'Nigra', with flowers much deeper in colour than the species, has gained the Royal Horticultural Society's Award of Garden Merit. It prefers an acid or neutral soil, in full sun or light shade.

This species is one of the parents of the popular hybrid saucer magnolia, M. ×  soulangeana, the other parent being the Yulan magnolia, M. denudata.

References

External links

liliiflora
Ornamental trees